Amy Harris (born 1983) is an Australian ballet dancer, principal artist with The Australian Ballet.

Early life and training
Harris was born in Ararat, Victoria. At the age of three, she started attending ballet, jazz and tap dancing class, and began ba Cecchetti training at the age of 10. In 1999, at the age of 15, Harris relocated to Melbourne to train at The Australian Ballet School.

Career
Harris graduated into The Australian Ballet in 2002. She was named in 2007, soloist in 2011 and became a senior artist in 2012. Her very first principal role is Calabosse in The Sleeping Beauty. She had also performed roles such as Hannah Glawari in The Merry Widow, Romola in Nijinsky and Princess Aurora in The Sleeping Beauty. In 2018, after her performance as Tertulla in the world premiere of Lucas Jervies' Spartacus. , she was promoted to principal artist on stage.

Personal life
Harris is married to fellow company member Jarryd Madden. They have a daughter and a son.

Selected repertoire
The Queen of Hearts in Alice's Adventures in Wonderland
Infra
Aurora and the Lilac Fairy in The Sleeping Beauty
The Stepmother in Cinderella
Baroness von Rothbart in Graeme Murphy's Swan Lake
Swanilda in Coppélia
Romola in Nijinsky
Hanna in The Merry Widow

Awards
Telstra Ballet Dancer Award 2012
Telstra People's Choice Award 2010, 2008

References

External links
 Cupcakes & Conversation with Amy Harris. Ballet News. 9 March 2010.

Australian ballerinas
People from Ararat, Victoria
1983 births
Living people
Telstra People's Choice Award winners
Australian Ballet principal dancers
21st-century ballet dancers
21st-century Australian dancers